Garth Leslie MacGuigan (born February 16, 1956) is a Canadian former professional ice hockey centre. He was selected by the NHL's New York Islanders 50th overall in the third round of the 1976 NHL Amateur Draft. In the same year he was drafted 56th overall in the fifth round by the Quebec Nordiques in the WHA Amateur Draft. He went on to play in five games for the New York Islanders between 1979 and 1984.

MacGuigan was born in Charlottetown, Prince Edward Island.

Career statistics

Regular season and playoffs

External links
 

1956 births
Living people
Canadian ice hockey centres
Fort Worth Texans players
Sportspeople from Charlottetown
Ice hockey people from Prince Edward Island
Indianapolis Checkers players
Indianapolis Checkers (CHL) players
Montreal Juniors players
Montreal Bleu Blanc Rouge players
Muskegon Mohawks players
New York Islanders draft picks
New York Islanders players
Quebec Nordiques (WHA) draft picks